Joelton Air Force Station (ADC ID: SM-145) is a closed United States Air Force General Surveillance Radar station. It was closed in 1960.

History
Joelton Air Force Station (AFS) was initially part of Phase II of the Air Defense Command Mobile Radar program. The Air Force approved this expansion of the Mobile Radar program on October 23, 1952 to provide radar coverage of the Nashville, TN area.  Radars in this network were designated "SM."

The station became operational on 1 October 1956 when the 799th Aircraft Control and Warning Squadron began operating an AN/MPS-11 search radar and an AN/TPS-10D height-finder radar. Eventually these sets were replaced by more-modern AN/FPS-6 height-finder radar and AN/FPS-8 search radar sets.  Initially the station functioned as a Ground-Control Intercept (GCI) and warning station.  As a GCI station, the squadron's role was to guide interceptor aircraft toward unidentified intruders picked up on the unit's radar scopes.

In addition to the main facility, Guthrie operated an unmanned AN/FPS-18 Gap Filler site:
 Bradyville, TN  (SM-145A) 

Joelton AFS was closed on 1 June 1961 due to budgetary constraints. However, the FAA retained the radar, replacing the search radar with an ARSR-1E model. The FAA continues to operate the site as part of the Joint Surveillance System (JSS).  Most of the Air Force buildings remain and are in use; the housing area is now private residences.

Air Force units and assignments

Units
 Constituted as the 799th Aircraft Control and Warning Squadron
 Activated at Wright-Patterson AFB (SM-170), OH on 8 February 1956
 Moved to Joelton AFS on 1 October 1956
 Discontinued and inactivated on 1 June 1961

Assignments
 58th Air Division, 1 October 1956
 35th Air Division, 1 September 1958
 32d Air Division, 15 November 1958 – 1 June 1961

See also
 List of USAF Aerospace Defense Command General Surveillance Radar Stations
 List of United States Air Force aircraft control and warning squadrons

References

Notes

Bibliography

 
Further Reading
 
 Grant, C.L., (1961)  The Development of Continental Air Defense to 1 September 1954, USAF Historical Study No. 126
 
  
 
 Radomes.org Information for Joelton AFS, TN

Installations of the United States Air Force in Tennessee
Permanent System radar stations
Military installations closed in 1960
1956 establishments in Tennessee
1960 disestablishments in Tennessee